Malik Ausean Evans (born July 5, 1973) is a retired American professional basketball player.

References

External links

1973 births
Living people
Basketball players from Houston
Vanderbilt Commodores men's basketball players
American expatriate basketball people in North Macedonia
American men's basketball players
Forwards (basketball)